Chen Hsiao-chuan (born May 18, 1985 in Hualien, Taiwan) is a Taiwanese female football player. She usually plays as defender.

In April 2010, she passed Real Valladolid Femenino's tryout and signed with the Spanish club with compatriot Tan Wen-lin. Her shirt name is "Rona". She made her debut in a pre-season friendly match against CD Amigos del Duero, in which she scored six goals for RVF. She earns 300 euros a month like her compatriots from Taiwan and because of such a low wage rumors have it she and her compatriots will try to sign for a club that will pay better. Rumors say she recently did a tryout for Real Madrid but did not get accepted.

References

External links
 Chen Hsia-chuan's profile at Real Valladolid official web site

1985 births
Living people
Taiwanese women's footballers
People from Hualien County
Expatriate women's footballers in Spain
Taiwanese expatriates in Spain
Women's association football midfielders